The White Moth is a 1924 American silent drama film produced and directed by Maurice Tourneur and distributed by First National Pictures. Barbara La Marr was the female lead supported by young Ben Lyon.

Cast
Barbara La Marr as Mona Reid / The White Moth
Conway Tearle as Vantine Morley
Charles de Rochefort as Gonzalo Montrez (credited as Charles de Roche)
Ben Lyon as Douglas Morley
Edna Murphy as Gwendolyn Dallas
Josie Sedgwick as Ninon Aurel
Kathleen Kirkham as Mrs. Delancey
William Orlamond as Tothnes

Preservation
The White Moth survives at the Library of Congress, Museum of Modern Art, and Gosfilmofond in Moscow.

References

External links

1924 films
American silent feature films
Films directed by Maurice Tourneur
First National Pictures films
Films with screenplays by Barbara La Marr
1924 drama films
Silent American drama films
American black-and-white films
Surviving American silent films
1920s American films